Pentispa is a genus of tortoise beetles and hispines in the family Chrysomelidae. There are more than 20 described species in Pentispa.

Species
These 29 species belong to the genus Pentispa:

 Pentispa aequatoriana Weise, 1910
 Pentispa amplipennis Uhmann, 1930
 Pentispa atrocaerulea (Champion, 1894)
 Pentispa beata (Baly, 1886)
 Pentispa bilimeki Spaeth, 1937
 Pentispa candezei (Chapuis, 1877)
 Pentispa chevrolati (Chapuis, 1877)
 Pentispa clarkella (Baly, 1886)
 Pentispa collaris (Thunberg, 1805)
 Pentispa cristata (Chapuis, 1877)
 Pentispa cyanipennis Pic, 1933
 Pentispa distincta (Baly, 1886)
 Pentispa emarginata (Chapuis, 1877)
 Pentispa explanata (Chapuis, 1877)
 Pentispa fairmairei (Chapuis, 1877)
 Pentispa geniculata Pic, 1932
 Pentispa larssoni Uhmann, 1957
 Pentispa melanura (Chapuis, 1877)
 Pentispa morio (Fabricius, 1801)
 Pentispa parumpunctata Weise, 1910
 Pentispa perroudi Pic, 1933
 Pentispa pratti Pic, 1932
 Pentispa rockefelleri Pallister, 1953
 Pentispa sallaei (Baly, 1886)
 Pentispa sanguinipennis (Baly, 1886)
 Pentispa sulcifrons (Champion, 1894)
 Pentispa suturalis (Baly, 1885)
 Pentispa vittatipennis (Baly, 1886)
 Pentispa viturati Pic, 1932

References

Further reading

 
 
 
 

Cassidinae
Articles created by Qbugbot